The Proton-M, (Протон-М) GRAU index 8K82M or , is an expendable Russian heavy-lift launch vehicle derived from the Soviet-developed Proton. It is built by Khrunichev, and launched from sites 81 and 200 at the Baikonur Cosmodrome in Kazakhstan. Commercial launches are marketed by International Launch Services (ILS), and generally use Site 200/39. The first Proton-M launch occurred on 7 April 2001.

Proton flew its most recent mission on 13 December 2021, launching two Ekspress communication satellites into geostationary orbit. As of August 2020, a number of Roscosmos and other Russian government missions remain on Proton launch manifest.

Vehicle description 

The Proton-M launch vehicle consists of three stages; all of them powered by liquid rocket engines using the hypergolic propellant combination of dinitrogen tetroxide as the oxidizer, and unsymmetrical dimethylhydrazine for fuel.

The first stage is unique in that it consists of a central cylindrical oxidizer tank with the same diameter as the other two stages with six fuel tanks attached to its circumference, each carrying an engine. The engines in this stage can swivel tangentially up to 7.0° from the neutral position, providing full thrust vector control. The rationale for this design is logistics: the diameter of the oxidizer tanks and the two following stages is the maximum that can be delivered by railroad to Baikonur. However, within Baikonur the fully assembled stack is transported again by rail, as it has enough clearance.

The second stage uses a conventional cylindrical design. It is powered by three RD-0210 engines and one RD-0211 engine. The RD-0211 is a version of the RD-0210 modified with a heat exchanger used to pressurize the propellant tanks. The second stage is joined to the first stage through a net instead of a closed inter-stage, to allow the exhaust to escape because the second stage begins firing seconds before separation. Known as "hot staging," this eliminates the need for ullage thrusters on the second stage. Thrust vector control is provided by engine gimballing.

The third stage is also of a conventional cylindrical design. It contains the avionics system that controls the first two stages. It uses one RD-0213 which is a fixed (non-gimballed) version of the RD-0210, and one RD-0214 which is a four nozzle vernier engine used for thrust vector control. The nozzles of the RD-0214 can turn up to 45.0°; they are placed around (with some separation), and moderately above the nozzle of the RD-0213.

The Proton-M features modifications to the lower stages to reduce structural mass, increase thrust, and utilise more propellant. A closed-loop guidance system is used on the first stage, which allows more complete consumption of propellant. This increases the rocket's performance slightly compared to previous variants, and reduces the amount of toxic chemicals remaining in the stage when it impacts downrange. It can place up to  into low Earth orbit. With an upper stage, it can place a 3000 kg payload into geostationary orbit (GEO), or a 5500 kg payload into geostationary transfer orbit (GTO). Efforts were also made to reduce dependency on foreign component suppliers.

Upper stage 
Most Proton-M launches have used a Briz-M upper stage to propel the spacecraft into a higher orbit. Launches have also been made with Blok-DM upper stages: six launches were made with the Blok DM-02 upper stage carrying GLONASS spacecraft, while seven further launches have used the Blok DM-03. As of 2023, only a single Proton-M launch has taken place without an upper stage, to launch Nauka (ISS module) and the European Robotic Arm (ERA) to the International Space Station in July 2021.

Payload fairing 

Commercial launches conducted by ILS use two kinds of fairings:
PLF-BR-13305 short fairing.
PLF-BR-15255 long fairing.

Both fairings have a diameter of 4.35 meters.

Proton-M Enhanced (M+) 
On 7 July 2007, International Launch Services launched the first Proton-M Enhanced rocket (also called M+), which carried the DirecTV-10 satellite into orbit. This was the 326th launch of a Proton, the 16th Proton-M/Briz-M launch, and the 41st Proton launch to be conducted by ILS. It features more efficient first stage engines, updated avionics, lighter fuel tanks and more powerful vernier engines on the Briz-M upper stage, and mass reduction throughout the rocket, including thinner fuel tank walls on the first stage, and use of composite materials on all other stages. The second launch of this variant occurred on 18 August 2008, and was used to place Inmarsat 4 F3 into orbit. The baseline Proton-M was retired in November 2007, in favour of the Enhanced variant.

Frank McKenna, CEO of ILS, has indicated that in 2010 the Phase III Proton design would become the standard ILS configuration, with the ability to lift 6150 kg to GTO.

On 19 October 2011, ViaSat-1 weighing 6740 kg was lifted into GTO by the Proton-M/Briz-M Phase III.

Light and Medium variants 
Proton Light and Proton Medium were two proposed variants with a lower payload capacity at a reduced price. Originally proposed end of 2016, Proton Light was cancelled in 2017  and Proton Medium was put on "indefinite hold" in 2018. The variants were designed to reduce the cost for launching medium and small commercial communications satellites into Geostationary Transfer Orbit (GTO). The variants were planned with a 2 + 1 stage architecture based on 3 stage Proton/Briz M, but dispensing with the 2nd stage and featuring minor lengthening of the other two stages. The Proton Light 1st stage was planned with 4 main engines and external tanks to the 6 used by Proton Medium and Proton-M. The cost was expected to be competitive with Ariane and SpaceX. The planned maiden flights were 2018 for Proton Medium and 2019 for Proton Light. They were expected to use Baikonur Cosmodrome Site 81/24 and would have required a new transporter-erector system and other ground infrastructure changes.
 
The full-sized Proton-M can currently lift 6300 kg into a standard Geostationary Transfer Orbit (GTO); Proton Medium was planned to lift 5000 kg into a similar GTO while Proton Light was rated for 3600 kg. The 3000–5000 kg payload range includes all-electric and hybrid satellites that use ion thrusters to slowly make their way into geostationary orbit (GEO).

Launch profile 
In a typical mission, a Proton-M is accompanied by a Briz-M upper stage. The Proton-M launches the orbital unit (that is: the payload, the payload adapter and the Briz-M) into a slightly suborbital trajectory. The first and second stages and the payload fairing crash into designated crash sites; the third stage crashes into the ocean. After the third stage separates, the orbital unit coasts for a brief period, then Briz-M performs its first firing to achieve orbital injection into a parking orbit with 51.5° inclination, at 170 km to 230 km altitude (the Mission Planner's Guide also mentions 64.8° and 72.6° as standard inclinations for the parking orbit). Subsequently, the Briz-M performs orbital maneuvers to place the payload into either its final orbit or a transfer orbit. If a transfer orbit is used the final maneuver(s) are performed by the payload on its own propulsion system.

Reliability 

Four of these failures were the results of problems with the Proton-M itself, six were caused by the Briz-M upper stage malfunctioning and leaving cargo in a useless orbit (albeit on two instances the satellites were able to maneuver to correct orbit under their own propulsion), and one was the result of a Blok DM-03 upper stage being incorrectly fueled, leaving the Proton too heavy to achieve orbit.

Notable launch failures 
In September 2007, a Proton-M/Briz-M rocket carrying Japan's JCSAT-11 communications satellite failed to achieve orbit, and fell in the Ulytau District of Kazakhstan. An investigation determined that first and second stages of the rocket had failed to separate, due to a damaged pyrotechnic cable.

On 5 December 2010, the upper stage and payloads failed to reach orbital velocity due to overloading of the upper stage with 1500 kg of liquid oxygen, resulting in the loss of three GLONASS satellites it was carrying.

In July 2013, a Proton-M/DM-03 carrying three GLONASS satellites failed shortly after liftoff. The booster began pitching left and right along the vertical axis within a few seconds of launch. Attempts by the onboard guidance computer to correct the flight trajectory failed and ended up putting it into an unrecoverable pitchover. The upper stages and payload were stripped off 24 seconds after launch due to the forces experienced followed by the first stage breaking apart and erupting in flames. Impact with the ground occurred 30 seconds after liftoff. The preliminary report of the investigation into the July 2013 failure indicated that three of the first stage angular velocity sensors, responsible for yaw control, were installed in an incorrect orientation. As the error affected the redundant sensors as well as the primary ones, the rocket was left with no yaw control, which resulted in the failure. Telemetry data also indicated that a pad umbilical had detached prematurely, suggesting that the Proton may have launched several tenths of a second early, before the engines reached full thrust.

In May 2014, another Proton-M launch ended in failure, resulting in the loss of an Ekspress telecommunications satellite. Unlike the 2013 crash, this occurred more than nine minutes into the flight when one of the third stage verniers shut off, causing loss of attitude control. An automatic shutdown and destruct command was issued and the remains of the upper stages and payload impacted in northern China. An investigation committee concluded that the failure was most likely due to one of the turbopumps breaking off its mount, rupturing a propellant line and causing the vernier to lose thrust.

In May 2015, a Proton-M with a Mexican telecommunications satellite, MexSat-1, was lost due to problems with the third stage. Russian sources indicated that the problems had been the same as with the 2014 failure. An investigation determined that the third stage vernier engine RD-0214 failed due to excessive vibration loads, which had been caused by an increasing imbalance of the rotor in the turbopump and concluded it was the same cause of a prior accident in 1988.

In a June 2016 launch, one of the four second stage engines shut down prematurely. The Briz-M was able to make up for the resulting stage under-performance and deliver the Intelsat 31 satellite to the intended orbit. Pending an investigation, the rocket was grounded for the rest of 2016 and first half of 2017: Proton-M at that time planned to return to the launch pad around June 2017 to deliver the EchoStar-21 satellite to orbit.

On 28 January 2017, the Russian government announced, as a result of the investigation into the failure of Progress MS-04, the recall of all Proton-M 2nd and 3rd stage engines produced by the Voronezh Mechanical Plant, including the disassembly of three completed Proton rockets and a three and a half month suspension of flights. The investigation found that cheaper alternatives, unable to resist high temperatures, had been used in place of engine parts containing valuable minerals, and that production and certification documentation had been falsified.

Proton returned to flight 8 June 2017, a full year after the previous flight on 6 June 2016.

Upper stage malfunctions 
Among the various Proton-M failures, some have been caused by the upper stages used to allow the rocket to deliver payloads to higher orbit, notably the failures in May 2014 and May 2015.

At least five earlier launches also succumbed to problems with the Briz-M upper stage; Arabsat-4A in February 2006, AMC-14 in March 2008, Ekspress AM4 in August 2011, Telkom-3 and Ekspress MD2 in August 2012 and Yamal-402 in December 2012. All of the payloads were unusable except for Yamal-402, which was able to correct its orbit at the expense of several years' operational life, and AMC-14 which was sold to the US Government after SES determined that it couldn't complete its original mission.

Effect on government and industry 
As a result of the July 2013, Proton-M launch failure, a major reorganization of the Russian space industry was undertaken. The United Rocket and Space Corporation was formed as a joint-stock corporation by the government in August 2013 to consolidate the Russian space sector. Deputy Prime Minister Dmitry Rogozin said "the failure-prone space sector is so troubled that it needs state supervision to overcome its problems". Three days following the failure, the Russian government had announced that "extremely harsh measures" would be taken "and spell the end of the [Russian] space industry as we know it".

Environmental impact 
Critics claim that Proton rocket fuel (unsymmetrical dimethylhydrazine (UDMH)) and debris created by Russia's space programme is poisoning areas of Russia and Kazakhstan. Residents claim that acid rain falls after some launches. Anatoly Kuzin, deputy director of the Khrunichev State Research and Production Space Center, has however denied these claims, saying: "We did special research into the issue. The level of acidity in the atmosphere is not affected by the rocket launches [and] there is no data to prove any link between the illnesses, in Altai town and the influence of rocket fuel components or space activity of any kind".

See also 

 Comparison of heavy lift launch systems
 List of Proton launches

Notes

References 

Universal Rocket (rocket family)
Space launch vehicles of Russia
Vehicles introduced in 2001